Goodfellow's tree-kangaroo (Dendrolagus goodfellowi), also called the ornate tree-kangaroo, is an endangered, long-tailed, bear-like mammal native to rainforests of New Guinea. Like most tree-kangaroos (genus Dendrolagus), it lives in the treetops and feeds on leaves or other plant matter. It belongs to the macropod family (Macropodidae) along with kangaroos, and carries its young in a pouch like other marsupials. Its main threats are habitat loss and hunting.  There are two subspecies: D. g. goodfellowi and D. g. buergersi (known as Buergers' tree-kangaroo).

Name and taxonomy
The species name goodfellowi is in honour of British zoological collector Walter Goodfellow.

There are two subspecies of the Goodfellow's tree-kangaroo:
 Dendrolagus goodfellowi goodfellowi
 Dendrolagus goodfellowi buergersi – Buergers' tree-kangaroo

Description
Like other tree-kangaroos, Goodfellow's tree-kangaroos are quite different in appearance from terrestrial kangaroos. Unlike their land dwelling cousins, their legs are not disproportionately large in comparison to the forelimbs, which are strong and end in hooked claws for grasping tree limbs, and they have a long tail for balance. All of these features help the species with a predominantly arboreal existence. They have short, woolly fur, usually chestnut to red-brown in colour, grey-brown faces, yellow-coloured cheeks and feet; pale bellies, long, golden brown tails, and two golden stripes on their backsides. They weigh approximately 7 kg (about 15 lb).

Behaviour
Goodfellow's tree-kangaroos are slow and clumsy on the ground, moving at about walking pace and hopping awkwardly, leaning their bodies far forward to balance the heavy tail. However, in trees they are bold and agile. They climb by wrapping the forelimbs around the trunk of a tree and hopping with the powerful hind legs, allowing their forelimbs to slide. They have extraordinary jumping ability and have been known to jump to the ground from heights of 30 feet without harm.

Diet
Although they feed mainly on the leaves of the silkwood tree (Flindersia pimenteliana), other food is eaten when available, including various fruits, cereals, flowers and grasses. Goodfellow's tree-kangaroos have large stomachs that function as fermentation vats, similar to the stomachs of cattle and other ruminant herbivores, where bacteria break down fibrous leaves and grasses.

See also
Fauna of New Guinea
Fauna of Indonesia

References

Macropods
Marsupials of New Guinea
Mammals of Papua New Guinea
Mammals of Western New Guinea
Endangered fauna of Oceania
Mammals described in 1908
Taxa named by Oldfield Thomas